The Bulgarian records in swimming are the fastest ever performances of swimmers from Bulgaria, which are recognised and ratified by Bulgarian Swimming Federation (Българска федерация плувни спортове).

All records were set in finals unless noted otherwise.

Long Course (50 m)

Men

Women

Mixed relay

Short Course (25 m)

Men

Women

Mixed relay

Notes

References
General
 Bulgarian Long Course Records – Men 15 August 2022 updated
 Bulgarian Long Course Records – Women 17 July 2022 updated
 Bulgarian Short Course Records – Men 18 December 2022 updated
 Bulgarian Short Course Records – Women 26 November 2022 updated
Specific

External links
 Bulgaria Swimming web site

Bulgaria
Records
Swimming
Swimming